is the second indies single by Japanese girl group Melon Kinenbi, in a collaboration with . It was released as limited distribution on July 22, 2009. People that purchased the single from the Tower Records online store received a free original computer wallpaper.

Track listing

References

External links

2009 singles
2009 songs